Signum Laudis is a 1980 Czechoslovak war drama film directed by Martin Hollý. It is set during World War I.

Plot
The film is set on the Eastern Front of World War I. Corporal Hoferik  becomes a commander of his unit after the commanding officers are killed. He leads his men to an attack that leads to high casualties. Hoferik and his men are then pulled out to the rear. Hoferik's unit is part of Ziegler's regiment. The regiment is visited by General Berger and his staff. Berger and his staff doesn't know much about life on the front. Berger awards Hoferik the Signum Laudis. Hoferik is happy and wants to celebrate with his men but they hate him for his eagerness and fanaticism. They decline. Next day the estate where Hoferik's unit reside surrounded by enemies. Berger orders the regiment to attack but it is decimated. Hoferik's unit and Berger's staff escapes the estate but old General Gross is killed in a fight with enemy. Soldiers are in a hopeless situation and officers want to surrender. Hoferik wants to fight to the last men which leads other officers to hold a court during which is Hoferik accused of Gross' murder and sentenced to death. Hoferik is executed. Officers then order the remaining soldiers to strike the enemy and they (the soldiers) are all killed. Officers meanwhile surrender to enemy.

Cast 
 Vlado Müller as Corporal Adalbert Hoferik
 Josef Bláha as Captain Bruno König
 Ilja Prachař as General Friedrich Berger
 Radovan Lukavský as General Friedrich Gross
 Jiří Kodet as First Lieutenant Kostolány
 Oldřich Velen as Colonel Reznitzek
 Ladislav Frej as Lieutenant Colonel Rudolf Ziegler
 Pavel Zedníček as Feldwebel J. A. Wimmer
 Miroslav Zounar as Lieutenant Hans von Pallawski
 Jan Skopeček as Reisch known as Father

Reception

Accolades

References

External links 
 

1980 films
1980s war drama films
1980 drama films
Anti-war films about World War I
Czechoslovak drama films
Slovak war drama films
Czech war drama films
World War I films set on the Eastern Front
Golden Kingfisher winners
Czech World War I films